oneview was an English and German-speaking application for social bookmarking. The platform has already been brought into being from the multimedia-agency Denkwerk in 1998 and is therefore one of the first providers for social bookmarking worldwide. According to a statement, the platform has got a collection of more than 5 million bookmarks from its members by now.

Functions
The basic functions from oneview, as a social bookmarking service, consist in saving and organising links, tagging of links, central copying of saved links and in the provision of a spatio-temporal independent access on the link collection of one or all members. Moreover, the collected information can be shared with other users.

In order that the user can find the information quickly, oneview provides a search function. In this search, human filtered information is presented to the user. The combination of different tags, as a search survey, serves to find the favoured information quickly as well.

For registered users there is the possibility to set up an individual collection of bookmarks and to provide them with tags. Thus, the user has access on the individually collected links and can retrieve them at any time. The bookmarks collected by the user can be labeled as private or public. Bookmarks with public liberalisation are available for other users, no matter if they are registered or not. Public liberalisation contains placing of other tags from other users (see also Folksonomy).

History and development
Due to early establishment, oneview is seen as one of the pioneers of the current social bookmarking and search offers. In these days, the idea has been welcomed from its users and has been available in 12 speeches online in 2001. oneview was awarded a. o. for the concept with the German Multimedia-Award in 1999 and the "World Medal" of the New York Festivals in the same year. In August 2000 the „Best in eBusiness Award" followed suit.

The Oneview 2.0 platform was released as beta in 2005, then in March 2007 the 2.0 platform came out of beta and replaced the 1.0 platform. The financial interest of the publishing company M. DuMont Schauberg in Cologne has been made public.

In 2015 this service was closed.

See also
 Web 2.0
 Social bookmarking
 List of social software

References

External links
 

German social networking websites
Social bookmarking
Internet properties established in 1998
Companies based in Cologne